Cellophane Symphony is the seventh studio album by American rock band Tommy James and the Shondells, released in October 1969 through Roulette Records. The album was re-issued on CD in 2014 by Rhino Records.

Track listing

Personnel
Tommy James and the Shondells 
 Tommy James – lead vocals, guitars, keyboards 
 Eddie Gray – lead guitar, backing vocals 
 Ronnie Rosman – keyboards, backing vocals 
 Mike Vale – bass guitar, backing vocals 
 Pete Lucia – drums, percussion, backing vocals

Additional personnel
 Bruce Staple – engineer
 Carol Geyer – sleeve design

Charts

References

Tommy James and the Shondells albums
1969 albums